Lehmann is a German surname.

Geographical distribution
As of 2014, 75.3% of all bearers of the surname Lehmann were residents of Germany, 6.6% of the United States, 6.3% of Switzerland, 3.2% of France, 1.7% of Australia and 1.3% of Poland.

In Germany, the frequency of the surname was higher than national average in the following states:
 1. Brandenburg (1:90)
 2. Saxony (1:206)
 3. Saxony-Anhalt (1:227)
 4. Berlin (1:228)
 5. Mecklenburg-Vorpommern (1:408)
 6. Thuringia (1:493)

In Switzerland, the frequency of the surname was higher than national average in the following cantons:
 1. Bern (1:240)
 2. Solothurn (1:342)
 3. Fribourg (1:486)
 4. Basel-Stadt (1:524)
 5. Jura (1:567)
 6. Thurgau (1:606)

People
 Adolf Lehmann, (1863-1937), Canadian chemist who worked in India 
 Anna Ilsabe Lehmann, wife of Barthold Brockes
 Beatrix Lehmann, British actress
 Christina Lehmann (born 1951), German chess master
 Christopher Lehmann-Haupt, American journalist, editor, critic and novelist
 Claire Lehmann, Australian writer and editor of Quillette
 Danny Lehmann, American baseball coach
 Darren Lehmann, Australian cricket batsman, and Australian national cricket team coach
 Dirk Lehmann, German footballer
 Else Lehmann, German stage actress
 Erich Leo Lehmann, American statistician
 Erik E. Lehmann, (born 1963), German economist
 Ernst A. Lehmann, (1886-1937), German airship pilot
 Federico Carlos Lehmann (1914–1974), Colombian ornithologist
 Frederick William Lehmann, former United States Solicitor General
 Friedrich Carl Lehmann (1850–1903), German consul to Colombia and botanical collector
 Geoffrey Lehmann, Australian poet
 Hans G. Lehmann, German photographer
 Harry Lehmann, German physicist
 Lehmann–Symanzik–Zimmermann
 Henri Lehmann, German artist
 Henry Lehmann, American engineer, emigre from Germany
 Herman Lehmann (1859–1932), American kidnapped by Native-Americans
 Imogen Oona Lehmann, German curler
 Inge Lehmann, Danish seismologist
 Lehmann discontinuity
 Issachar Berend Lehmann, German banker
 Jacob Heinrich Wilhelm Lehmann (1800–1863), German astronomer
 Lehmann (lunar crater)
 Jean-Pierre Lehmann, professor of international political economy at IMD and founding director of The Evian Group at IMD
 Jens Lehmann, (born 1969), German football (soccer) player (goalkeeper)
 Jens Lehmann, German cyclist and politician
 Johann Georg Christian Lehmann, German botanist
 Johann Gottlob Lehmann, German geologist
 John Lehmann, English poet
 Jörgen Lehmann, Danish-born Swedish chemist
 Julius Friedrich Lehmann (1864–1935), promoter of social psychiatry during the Third Reich
 Justus F. Lehmann, prominent German-American physiatrist
 Karl Bernhard Lehmann (1858–1940), German microbiologist
 Karl Lehmann (1936–2018), Bishop of Mainz, Cardinal of the Catholic Church
Karl Leo Heinrich Lehmann (1894–1960), German-born American art historian, archeologist, and professor at New York University Institute of Fine Arts.
 Kevin K. Lehmann, American chemist
 Lilli Lehmann (1848–1929), German soprano and voice coach, sister of Marie
 Liza Lehmann (1862–1918), English operatic soprano and composer
 Lotte Lehmann (1888–1976), German singer
 Marie Lehmann (1851–1931), German soprano and voice teacher, sister of Lilli
 Marcus Lehmann (1831–1890), German Rabbi and author
 Michael Lehmann, film and television director
 Olga Lehmann, English artist and film designer
 Orla Lehmann, Danish statesman
 Otto Lehmann (physicist) (1855–1922), German physicist
 Otto Lehmann (movie producer) (1889–1968), German movie producer
 Peter Lehmann (winemaker), Australian vintner
 Peter Lehmann (author), German author and publisher
 R. C. Lehmann, politician, humourist and father of Beatrix, Rosamond and John
 Rosamond Lehmann, British novelist
 Rudolf Lehmann (artist), (1819–1905), a German-English portraitist and author
 Rudolph Chambers Lehmann, former editor of Punch magazine
 Stephan Lehmann, Swiss football goalkeeper
 Sven Lehmann  (born 1979), German politician
 Sylvia Lehmann (born 1954), German politician
 Tommy Lehmann, Swedish ice hockey player
 Willi Lehmann, German spy for the Soviets
 Winfred P. Lehmann, American linguist

See also
 Lehmann (disambiguation)
 Lehman
 Lehmannia, a genus of slugs
 Lemann
 Herr Lehmann, book by Sven Regener
 LGB (Lehmann Gross Bahn), a producer of toy locomotives
 Lehmann–Scheffé theorem

References

German-language surnames
Jewish surnames
Levite surnames
Yiddish-language surnames
Surnames from status names